Petrivka is a neighborhood located in the Obolonskyi District (district) of Kyiv, the capital of Ukraine. It is located in the northern part of the city, neighboring the historical neighborhood of the Podil itself to its south.

One of the city's largest book markets is located in the neighborhood. Petrivka is served by a Pochaina metro station of the Kyiv Metro's Obolonsko–Teremkivska Line, and the Pochaina Railway Station of the Ukrzaliznytsia.

References

Neighborhoods in Kyiv
Obolonskyi District